Scandinavian legend may refer to:

 Scandinavian folklore
 Scandinavian literature